Janseola thoinds is a moth in the family Heterogynidae. It was described by Alberto Zilli and colleagues in 1988.

References

Heterogynidae